Genome Informatics (also genoinformatics or genetic information processing) is a scientific study of information processing in genomes.

Introduction 
Information processing and information flow occur in the course of an organism's development and throughout its lifespan. The essence of computation is information processing, and the essence of biological information processing is control of the molecular events inside a cell. Genome informatics introduces computational techniques and applies them to derive information from genome sequences. Genome informatics includes methods to analyze DNA sequence information and to predict protein sequence and structure. Methods of studying a large genomic data include variant-calling, transcriptomic analysis, and variant interpretation. Genome informatics can analyze DNA sequence information and to predict protein sequence and structure. Genome informatics dealing with microbial and metagenomics, sequencing algorithms, variant discovery and genome assembly, evolution, complex traits and phylogenetics, personal and medical genomics, transcriptomics, genome structure and function. Genoinformatics refers to genome and chromosome dynamics, quantitative biology and modeling, molecular and cellular pathologies. Genome informatics also includes the field of genome design. There still a lot more we can do and develop in Genome Informatics. Find a potential disease, searching a solution for a disease, or proving why people get sick for no reason. For genomic informatics there are several main applications for it, including:

 genome information analysis

 computational modelling of gene regulatory networks
 models for complex eukaryotic regulatory DNA sequences
 an algorithm for Ab Initio DNA Motif Detection

Applications 

Biomolecular systems that can process information are sought for computational applications, because of their potential for parallelism and miniaturization and because their biocompatibility also makes them suitable for future biomedical applications. DNA has been used to design machines, motors, finite automata, logic gates, reaction networks and logic programs, amongst many other structures and dynamic behaviours.

See also 
 cellular computing

References

Academic disciplines
Bioinformatics
Genetic mapping